The FIA Formula 2 Championship is a second-tier single-seater championship organised by the Fédération Internationale de l'Automobile (FIA). Held on racing circuits, the championship was introduced in 2017, following the rebranding of the long-term Formula One feeder series GP2. The series' original founders were Flavio Briatore and current managing director Bruno Michel.

Designed to make racing relatively affordable for the teams and to make it an ideal training ground for life in Formula One, Formula 2 has made it mandatory for all of the teams to use the same chassis, engine and tyre supplier so that true driver ability is reflected. Formula 2 mainly races on European circuits, but has appearances at other international race tracks as well such as the Bahrain International Circuit in Bahrain, the Jeddah Corniche Circuit in Saudi Arabia and the Yas Marina Circuit in the United Arab Emirates.

While significantly slower than Formula One, the Formula 2 championship cars are faster than most other circuit racing vehicles. As of 2022, the F2 lap record for the Imola Circuit, while roughly 15 seconds per lap slower than Formula One, is five seconds per lap faster than LMP1 sports cars and the more junior open wheeler category Formula 3, and more than 20 seconds per lap faster than TCR Touring Cars.

Origins

Numbering system
The numbering system in FIA Formula 2 Championship is currently based on the previous season's team standings (similar to Formula One 1996–2013 numbering system) that was used since the formation of GP2 Series in 2005 until present. Additionally, since the 2020 season the number #19 has been retired along with #18 to honor Anthoine Hubert who sustained fatal injuries during one of the 2019 Belgian Grand Prix's support races.

Race weekend
Pit stops are optional if there is a force majeure event like a change in weather conditions, tyre puncture, front or rear wing damage or others.

On Friday, there is one Free Practice session of 45 minutes and one Qualifying session of 30 minutes.

On Saturday, one Sprint Race will take place and will consist of 120 kilometres or 45 minutes, whichever comes first. The starting grid will be determined by reversing the top 10 finishers of Friday's Qualifying session.

On Sunday, the Feature Race will take place ahead of the Formula 1 Grand Prix and will consist of 170 kilometres or 60 minutes, whichever comes first.

Points system
The top 8 finishers in the Sprint Race receive points as follows:

The top 10 finishers in the Feature Race receive points as follows:

The driver who qualified in pole position for the Feature race during Friday's qualifying session receives an additional 2 points.

In each race, one point will be awarded to the driver who achieves the fastest lap time, providing he was in the top 10 positions of the final race classification.

The maximum number of points a driver can score at any round will be 39.

A count-back system is used to decide places of drivers with equal points in the championship with the driver with most wins ranking highest of those with equal points totals. If there is still a tie, the most second-place finishes, then the most third-place finishes, etc., is used to split the tied drivers. This count-back system is applied at all stages of the championship.

Racing flags
These are the racing flags that are used in Formula 2 Championship race weekends:

Costs

One estimate puts the cost of running a Formula Two car at $US 3 million per season. Typically, most of these costs must be paid by the driver, through personal sponsorship, or personal or family wealth. These costs, as well as the costs of competing in more junior categories, represent a major barrier to drivers reaching Formula One.

A number of cost control measures, including freezing car specifications and reducing the number of venues, were introduced by the FIA for the 2021 season.

Car specifications
The FIA Formula 2 Championship car is used by all of the teams, and features a carbon-fiber monocoque Dallara chassis, powered by a single-turbocharged direct-injected Mecachrome V6 engine and mounted dry slick and rain treaded Pirelli tyres. Overall weight is 755 kg including the driver.

Chassis

First-generation (third-generation overall) 

The first-generation (third-generation overall) 2011–17 spec GP2/11 car which was used in the first season of the rebranded championship had been designed by Dallara Automobili. The obsolete GP2/11 car was fitted with the old Mecachrome 4.0-litre V8 naturally-aspirated engine as well as a taller and narrower rear wing inspired by those used in Formula One from 2009 to 2016.

Second-generation (fourth-generation overall) 

The F2 Championship currently uses the Dallara F2 2018 chassis.

The cost of a Dallara F2 2018 car is approximately €500,000. This includes the wheels, wings, steering wheel and other components but not the engine.

Drivetrain
The current gearbox is manufactured by Hewland (utilizing the LFSC-200 model) and features an 8-position barrel with ratchet body and software upgrades as well as a new transverse shafts fixing system designed to facilitate improved gear selection. Currently, the series uses a 6-speed sequential gearbox configuration with electro-hydraulic operation via paddle-shifters with reverse operated by a button on the steering wheel. The clutches of all cars are supplied by ZF Sachs with the multi-plate clutch operated by a hand-paddle lever.

Wheel rims
O.Z. Racing exclusively supplies wheel rims for all cars since 2005. From 2020 onwards all cars will switch to  road car-inspired wheel rims for the preparation of expanding to Formula One from 2022 onwards and also data sharing.

The wheel rims of all FIA Formula 2 cars are made of magnesium alloy.

Tyres
Similar to the 2011 change for Formula 1, Pirelli is now the sole tyre supplier for the series. The FIA Formula 2 Championship runs the different compounds and size as F1 since 2017 (due to in fact Formula 1's 2017–present tyres are wider, the FIA Formula 2 Championship carried over the pre-2017 Pirelli F1 tyres). The front tyre size are 245/660-R13 (9.6/26-R13) and rear tyre size are 325/660-R13 (12.8/26-R13) and will be used until the end of 2019 season. The compounds of Pirelli Formula 2 tyres are currently four dry compounds (purple supersoft (abolished after 2019), red soft, yellow medium and white hard) carrying P Zero brand and two wet compounds (green intermediate and blue wet) carrying Cinturato brand.

The new tyres were unveiled during the 2019 Monza FIA Formula 2 round with 18-inch wheel rims mounted. The tyre sizes will slightly differ from the sizes compared to 2011–2019 but the only changes are the wheel rim diameter increase (275/705-R18 (10.8/27.7-R18) on the fronts and 325/705-R18 (12.8/27.7-R18) on the rears).

Brakes
Brembo supplies monoblock brake calipers and disc bells, which are exclusive to Formula 2. Carbone Industrie also supplies carbon brake discs and pads for FIA Formula 2 Championship.

Fuel tank
The current Dallara F2 2018's fuel tank carried over the FIA standard Premier FT5 tank with the capacity up to 125 litres.

Refuelling during a race is currently banned due to safety and cost.

Suspension
The suspension of all FIA Formula 2 Championship cars are upper and lower steel wishbones, pushrod operated, coupled with twin Koni dampers and torsion bars suspension (front) and spring suspension (rear) similar to current Formula One car suspension.

Steering actuation system
The steering actuation system of all FIA Formula 2 Championship cars are manual, rack and pinion without power steering system (similar to IndyCar Series that has also manual steering actuation system).

Steering wheel
Since 2011, XAP Technology exclusively provides the XAP single-seater F2 steering wheel as well as XAP SX steering wheel dash display for all FIA Formula 2 Championship cars. The XAP steering wheel features 6 buttons in the front with 5 paddles (DRS, gear shift and clutch) in the back of steering wheel. From the 2018 season, all FIA Formula 2 Championship cars will utilize the all-new XAP Single-seat Formula 2451 S3 steering wheel with a larger dash screen and also three new rotary switches (similar to the current Formula E steering wheel).

Safety
The most current safety innovations are a top priority of the FIA Formula 2 Championship. Front, side, rear and steering column impact tests are the FIA safety standards. All cars include front and rear roll hoops, impact structures and monocoque push tests. Anti-intrusion survival cell protection panels have been used since 2011. Wheel retainer safety cables are also featured to avoid wheels flying similar to Formula One, IndyCar Series (known as SWEMS) and other single-seater Formula racing series. The seat belts of all FIA Formula 2 cars are supplied by Sabelt with a 6-point seat belt configuration similar to Formula One. From 2018 onwards, the "halo" cockpit protection system has been introduced to protect the drivers in crashes.

Other components
All FIA Formula 2 cars carry a Marelli-provided electronic control unit (Marvel SRG 480 model) as well as Marelli PDU 12–42 power supply management unit. Live telemetry is used only for television broadcasts, but the data can be recorded from the ECU to the computer if the car is in the garage and not on the track. Rear-view mirrors for all FIA Formula 2 cars are fully mandated to easily view opponents behind.

Aerodynamics
The aerodynamics of current Formula 2 cars are currently resembling the Formula One 2017-style aerodynamics with wider and curved front wings and also lower rear wings with parallelogram rear wing plates. Side winglets are also banned. The undertrays of all cars have ground effect features similar to 2022 Formula One cars.

Drag Reduction Systems (DRS)

Since 2015, the Drag Reduction Systems (DRS) were introduced in a purpose for overtaking maneuver assist by tilting the upper-element rear wing while approaching the opponent less than a second away by activating the DRS paddle behind the steering wheel. The upper-element rear wing angle is the same as a Formula One car which has over 40 degrees of angle. In an event of rainy conditions, Drag Reduction Systems are automatically deactivated for safety reasons.

Engine

First-generation (2005–2017) 
Starting in 2005 (under GP2 Series name), Formula 2 cars were powered by  V8, four-stroke piston, Otto cycle unleaded gasoline-burning, prototype production-based, naturally-aspirated engines, produced by Mecachrome. Per Formula 2 rules, the engines sold for no more than €70,000 and were rev-limited to 10,000 rpm.

The valve train is a dual overhead camshaft configuration with four valves per cylinder. The crankshaft is made of alloy steel, with five main bearing caps. The pistons are forged aluminium alloy, while the connecting rods are machined alloy steel. The electronic engine management system is supplied by Magneti Marelli, firing a CDI ignition system. The engine lubrication is a dry sump type, cooled by a single water pump.

Second-generation (2018–present) 
The V634 Turbo engine is a  V6 turbocharged direct injection four-stroke piston Otto cycle 620 hp fuel-efficient engine developed and built by Mecachrome, and maintained by Teos Engineering. The engine was unveiled in 2017 along with the new Dallara F2 2018 chassis. Dutch turbocharger company Van Der Lee Turbo Systems currently supplies the turbochargers for all FIA Formula 2 Championship engines.

The all-new engine fuel delivery system is gasoline direct injection instead of traditional electronic indirect injection. Mecachrome will continue providing new FIA Formula 2 engines from the 2018 season and beyond. The Mecachrome V634 Turbo engine is rev limited down to 8,750 rpm and weighs up to  including turbocharger. The firing ignition of the Mecachrome V634 Turbo engine is revolutionary digital inductive.

The Mecachrome V634 Turbo 3.4-litre single-turbocharged direct-injected Mecachrome V6 engine is an evolution of the GP3 engine, which is the solely supplied engine for the FIA Formula 2 Championship. With the addition of a single turbo, the engine underwent rigorous dyno testing, ahead of its racing debut. The Mecachrome V634 Turbo engines sells for up to €67,000 per unit by leasing and rebuilding.

The current second-generation FIA Formula 2 engine allocation is limited to one per season and lasts up to  after being rebuilt. Mid-season engine changes, including during race weekend, are banned and may result in a grid penalty for the session.

Turbocharger 
Turbochargers were introduced from the start of 2018 season. Dutch turbocharger company Van Der Lee Turbo Systems currently supplies the turbochargers for all FIA Formula 2 Championship all-new engines using the MT134-50120 model. The turbocharger spin limit is 130,000 rpm but cannot exceed 125,000 rpm due to lower turbo boost pressure.

Fuel and lubricants components
All Formula 2 cars currently use ordinary unleaded racing gasoline as fuel (similar to commercial vehicle unleaded street gasoline), which has been the de facto standard in second tier single-seater formula racing since the introduction of GP2 Series in 2005. Since the start of the 2005 GP2 Series season, Elf exclusively has continued to be the exclusive provider of the LMS 102 RON unleaded fuel and also Elf HTX 840 0W-40 lubricants for all competitors in the FIA Formula 2 Championship until 2022.

In 2023, Aramco became the official fuel partner and supplier of all FIA Formula 2 Championship entrants.

Other parts
The car also features internal cooling upgrades, a new water radiator, radiator duct, oil/water heat exchanger, modified oil degasser, new oil and water pipes and new heat exchanger fixing brackets.

Performance
According to research and pre-season stability tests, the 2005 model can accelerate from 0 to 200 km/h (124 mph) in 6.7 seconds. The car has a top speed of  meaning that it is the fastest single seater racing car behind Formula One and IndyCar Series.

History

2017

The 2017 season consisted of eleven rounds, ten of which supported the 2017 Formula One World Championship and a stand-alone event at the Circuito de Jerez. It began at Bahrain International Circuit on 15 April and concluded at Yas Marina Circuit on 26 November. The season saw rookie and reigning GP3 Series champion Charles Leclerc, driving for Prema Racing, take the drivers' title with seven race wins. The inaugural teams' championship was taken by Russian Time. This was also the final season for the Dallara GP2/11 chassis which débuted in 2011 when the series was known as GP2 and the Mecachrome 4.0 litre (244 cu in) V8 naturally-aspirated engine package which débuted in the inaugural GP2 season in 2005. Russian Time driver Artem Markelov finished the season as runner-up and DAMS driver Oliver Rowland was third. Champion Leclerc graduated to Formula One with Sauber, the only full-time driver of 2017 to do so. Sergey Sirotkin, who took part in a single round as a reserve driver for ART Grand Prix and had finished third in the 2016 GP2 Series, also graduated to Formula One with Williams.

2018

The 2018 season consisted of twelve rounds, all supporting the 2018 Formula One World Championship, beginning in Bahrain on 7 April and concluding in Abu Dhabi on 25 November. The 2018 season also introduced the new Dallara F2 2018 car as well as the all-new Mecachrome 3.4 litre (207 cu in) V6 turbo engine with a large single turbo and a double waste gate, supplied by Dutch turbocharger manufacturer Van Der Lee Turbo Systems. The car also featured the halo safety device for the first time, a device that was introduced into Formula One in the same year.

The Racing Engineering and Rapax teams left the series prior to the 2018 season, having competed in Formula 2 and the predecessor GP2 Series since 2005 and 2010 respectively. Carlin returned to the series after a year's absence and Charouz Racing System joined the championship after the World Series Formula V8 3.5 was discontinued. Carlin went on to win the teams' championship for the first time, having not done so during their time in the GP2 Series. The drivers' championship was won by rookie and reigning GP3 Series champion George Russell, who drove for ART Grand Prix and took seven race victories. Carlin driver Lando Norris finished as runner-up with DAMS driver Alexander Albon in third. All three drivers graduated to Formula One, with Russell, Norris and Albon joining Williams, McLaren and Toro Rosso respectively.

2019

The 2019 season consisted of 12 rounds supporting the 2019 Formula One World Championship, beginning in Bahrain on 30 March and concluding in Abu Dhabi on 1 December. Russian Time left the championship prior to 2019 after having competed in Formula 2 and GP2 since 2013. The team was sold and became UNI-Virtuosi Racing.

On 31 August 2019, on the second lap of the feature race at Spa-Francorchamps, a high-speed accident occurred involving Anthoine Hubert, Juan Manuel Correa and Giuliano Alesi. Hubert and Correa were taken to the circuit's medical centre where Hubert died from his injuries. Correa's injuries forced him to miss the rest of the season, whilst Alesi was unhurt. The race was abandoned and the sprint race on the following day was cancelled as a mark of respect. The Formula One  at the circuit on the day after the accident began with a moment of silence. Most drivers wore a black ribbon in remembrance. 2017 Formula 2 champion Charles Leclerc, a friend of Hubert, won the race and dedicated his victory to Hubert.

French team DAMS won the teams' championship, having last done so in 2014. The drivers' championship was won by ART Grand Prix driver Nyck de Vries in his third year of Formula 2, taking four race victories. DAMS driver Nicholas Latifi finished as runner-up with UNI-Virtuosi Racing driver Luca Ghiotto in third. Only Latifi would graduate to Formula One, joining Williams, whilst champion de Vries signed for Mercedes-Benz in Formula E.

2020

Hitech Grand Prix, who had briefly entered the 2005 GP2 Series in partnership with Piquet GP and had since raced only in Formula Three championships, entered Formula 2 as the eleventh team. Arden, who had raced in Formula 2 and its predecessors since 1997, left the series. Their entry was taken over by HWA Team and became BWT HWA Racelab.

The season was due to begin in Bahrain on 21 March and was set to include a round at Circuit Zandvoort for the first time, replacing the round at Circuit Paul Ricard. However, a number of races were postponed or cancelled in response to the COVID-19 pandemic and a new calendar was published. The season began at the Red Bull Ring on 4 July and ran alongside the first ten rounds of the 2020 Formula One World Championship, and concluded on 6 December after two rounds in Bahrain.

Prema Racing secured the teams' championship for the first time since the 2016 GP2 Series. Prema driver Mick Schumacher won the drivers' championship in his second year of Formula 2 with two race victories. UNI-Virtuosi driver Callum Ilott was runner-up with Carlin's Yuki Tsunoda third.

2021

As part of a new cost-cutting measure, each round of the 2021 championship featured three races instead of two, and the number of rounds was reduced from twelve to eight. The calendar was also separated from the FIA Formula 3 Championship calendar, meaning the two series were scheduled to not appear at the same Grand Prix weekend. As a result, the Red Bull Ring, Hungaroring, Circuit de Barcelona-Catalunya, Circuit Paul Ricard and Circuit de Spa-Francorchamps, tracks that traditionally appeared on the Formula 2 calendar prior to the COVID-19 pandemic, were no longer included. A round at the newly built Jeddah Street Circuit was added to the calendar. The championship began in Bahrain on 27 March and concluded in Abu Dhabi on 12 December.

Prema Racing claimed their second consecutive teams' championship with three races remaining. Prema driver Oscar Piastri took six race victories on his way to winning the drivers' championship in his debut year, becoming the first non-European to do so. Piastri's teammate Robert Shwartzman was the runner-up and UNI-Virtuosi driver Zhou Guanyu finished third. Zhou was the only driver to graduate to a Formula One race seat, joining Alfa Romeo Racing. Champion Piastri became the reserve driver for Alpine F1 Team.

2022

The 2022 championship marked the return of the pre-2021 race format with two races per round, but with the points offered for sprint races, pole positions and fastest laps reduced. The calendar was expanded, with twenty-eight races taking place over fourteen rounds. The Red Bull Ring, Hungaroring, Circuit de Barcelona-Catalunya and Circuit de Spa-Francorchamps all returned to the calendar and rounds at Imola Circuit and Circuit Zandvoort took place for the first time. The round at Sochi Autodrom was cancelled along with the Formula One Russian Grand Prix due to the Russian invasion of Ukraine and was replaced by a round at Circuit Paul Ricard. The championship began in Bahrain on 19 March and is set to conclude in Abu Dhabi on 20 November. HWA Racelab left the series and their place was taken by Van Amersfoort Racing.

MP Motorsport claimed their first teams' championship in Formula 2. Their driver Felipe Drugovich, in his third year of Formula 2, won the drivers' championship. He took five race victories and clinched the title with three races remaining. Runner-up was ART Grand Prix's Théo Pourchaire with Carlin's Liam Lawson third. Fourth-placed Logan Sargeant was the only driver to graduate to a Formula One race seat, joining Williams, whilst the top three began roles as Formula One reserve drivers with Aston Martin, Alfa Romeo and Red Bull respectively.

2023

The 2023 championship is set to feature a round at the Albert Park Circuit alongside the Australian Grand Prix for the first time. The championship is scheduled to begin in Bahrain on 4 March and conclude in Abu Dhabi on 26 November.

Champions and awards

Drivers'

Teams'

Anthoine Hubert Award
The Anthoine Hubert Award was introduced at the prize-giving ceremony in Monaco in 2019, named in memory of Anthoine Hubert, who died during the 2019 Spa-Francorchamps round and was the only rookie in the season to score two race wins. The award is given to the highest-placed driver in their first Formula 2 season; the award is equivalent to 'Rookie/Newcomer of the Year' awards in other sports.

Drivers graduated to F1

 Bold denotes an active Formula One driver.

Wins

Drivers' total wins

Teams' total wins

Circuits 

 Bold denotes a current Formula One Circuit.
 Italic denotes a former Formula One Circuit.

Television rights 
The television rights are held by Formula One Management, which also manages the rights to Formula One. Sky Sports F1 show every practice, qualifying and race live in the United Kingdom, and so does Movistar Fórmula 1 in Spain and Sport Tv in Portugal. Coverage in North America is available exclusively on TSN5 (Canada) and ESPN3 (USA). In South East Asia, the races are shown live on Fox Sports Asia. Polsat Sport shows races in Poland. Band Sports show the F2 in Brazil, and Fox Sports 3 in Hispanic America. In India, Star Sports covers the races live.

See also
 FIA Formula 3 Championship
 European Formula Two Championship
 FIA Formula Two Championship (2009)
 Formula Two
 GP2 Series
 GP3 Series
 Indy NXT Series
 Super Formula Lights

Notes

References

External links
 

 
FIA Formula 2 Championship
One-make series
FIA Formula 2 Championship
Recurring sporting events established in 2017